The Borgia Bride is a 2005 novel by American writer Jeanne Kalogridis, portraying life in the Borgia dynasty through the eyes of Princess Sancha of Aragon.

References

2005 novels
House of Borgia
Novels set in the Renaissance
Novels set in Italy
Fiction set in the 1480s
Novels set in the 1490s
Fiction set in 1492
Cultural depictions of Cesare Borgia
Cultural depictions of Lucrezia Borgia
Cultural depictions of Pope Alexander VI